Local elections were held in the city of San Fernando in Pampanga on May 13, 2013, in conjunction with the 2013 Philippine midterm elections.  Registered voters of the city were electing candidates for the following elective local posts: city mayor, city vice mayor, and ten councilors.

Overview
Both incumbent mayor Oscar Samson Rodriguez and vice mayor Edwin Santiago have served their third terms, thus, are term limited. Rodriguez will return and will run for Congress for the third district of Pampanga, facing the incumbent Aurelio Gonzales Jr.

On October 1, 2012, the returning and first city mayor, Dr. Rey B. Aquino, filed his first certificate of candidacy in COMELEC office, together with their 10 candidates for city councilors under the banner of Team Fernandino.

Results

Names in boldface denote re-electionist candidates.

The candidates for mayor and vice mayor with the highest number of votes win their respective seats. They are elected separately; therefore, they may be of different parties when elected.

Mayor

Vice Mayor

City Councilors

Voting is via plurality-at-large voting:  Voters will vote for ten (10) candidates and the ten candidates with the highest number of votes are elected.

Of the incumbent councilors elected in 2010, six are not seeking re-election for various reasons:
Renato Agustin, who is graduating and is running for vice mayor under the Liberal Party,
Rosemary Calimlim, who is graduating;
Ruperto Dumlao, who is graduating;
Redentor Halili, who is graduating;
Jaime Lazatin, who is graduating and is running for vice mayor under the United Nationalist Alliance; and
Alex Patio, who is one of the nominees of party-list group Append Inc.

Candidates

Administration coalition (Team Magsilbi Tamu)

Primary opposition coalition (Team Fernandino)

Independent candidates not in tickets

Results

|-
|bgcolor=black colspan=5|

References

External links
Official website of the Commission on Elections
 Official website of National Movement for Free Elections (NAMFREL)
Official website of the Parish Pastoral Council for Responsible Voting (PPCRV)

2013 Philippine local elections
Elections in Pampanga
San Fernando, Pampanga